Yakou may refer to:

People 
 Yakou Méïté (born February 11, 1996), Ivorian football player

Places 
 Yakou (mountain pass), Taiwan
 Yakō Station, Yokohama, Japan

Traditions 
 Yakou Piao-se, an event in Yakou, Nanlang, China
 Dillybag, an Aboriginal Australian bag